The Gezirah Palace was one of the Egyptian royal palaces of the Muhammad Ali Dynasty.  It is located in the Zamalek district on Gezira Island in the Nile, just west of Downtown Cairo.

History
The Gezirah Palace, designed c. 1868, was commissioned by Khedive Ismail for entertaining visiting international dignitaries during the opening of the Suez Canal in 1869.

At the palace's opening ceremony, guests saw the first performance of Giuseppe Verdi's opera Aida, commissioned for the opening of the Suez Canal.

Ismail Pasha fell into debt and sold the Palace ten years after its construction to Michel Lutfallah who turned it into his private residence. The palace was known during that period as the Lutfallah Palace.

During the Veiled British Protectorate, the palace was sold to Paul Draneht and Commander Oblieght in 1889, and converted by the Compagnie Internationale des Grands Hotels into The Ghezireh Palace Hotel in October 1894. During World War I it was put into service as the No.2 Australian General Hospital, after the Mena House was unable to cope with the huge number of casualties from the Battle of Gallipoli.

Architecture 
The Gezira Palace was a neoclassical structure with an alhambresque style used for interior decorations, the portico façade, and a monumental garden pavilion. The landscaped gardens surrounding the palace included a zoo.

Renowned European architects were commissioned for the project:  of Germany designed the palace, Owen Jones of Britain did the interiors, and Carl von Diebitsch of Prussia designed the portico and the garden pavilion.

Present day
The Gezirah Palace is currently the central part of the Cairo Marriott Hotel complex, between the hotel's pair of towers, on Gezira Island north of the 6th October Bridge.

Gallery

References

External links 

 History of Cairo Marriott Hotel & Omar Khayyam Casino. 

Houses completed in 1869
Palaces in Cairo
Gezira Island
History of Cairo
Muhammad Ali dynasty
Neoclassical architecture in Egypt
1869 establishments in Egypt
19th-century architecture in Egypt